Mission Hills is a city in Johnson County, Kansas, United States, and part of the Kansas City Metropolitan Area.  As of the 2020 census, the population of the city was 3,594.  The east city limits is the Kansas-Missouri state line at State Line Road.  Mission Hills was originally developed by noted Kansas City developer J. C. Nichols beginning in the 1920s as part of his Country Club District plan.

History

An Indian mission was established at the town's site in the 1830s, hence the name of the later settlement.

The city started as a planned upscale community for the elite by J.C. Nichols to be built around the Mission Hills Country Club (Kansas) on the hills above Brush Creek just south of the Shawnee Methodist Mission.  Most of the country club's property is in Kansas but its original clubhouse was in Kansas City, Missouri, allowing it to serve liquor, which was prohibited on the Kansas side.  Nichols laid out plans in 1914. He had developed the country club to enhance the value of his Kansas properties after discovering that upscale buyers were reluctant to live on the Kansas side of the state line.

Adjoining the club Nichols established the Community Golf Club.  After it dramatically grew, it moved to what today is the Kansas City Country Club.  Nichols lured the Kansas City Country Club to take over the land, and the Community Golf Club went on to establish the Indian Hills Country Club.  Together, the three clubs became the most prestigious in the Kansas City metropolitan area; many rank them in order of prestige: Kansas City first, Mission Hills second, and Indian Hills third.

Nichols opposed incorporation of the community fearing that a city would not adequately meet the needs of its residents or properly enforce housing covenants.  Consequently, the Mission Hills Home Company was founded on August 18, 1914.  One of the most publicized early enforcements involved forbidding the family of a sick woman to enclose her porch with glass.

Faced with prospects of annexation by neighboring relatively lower income communities seeking its wealthy tax base, Mission Hills incorporated as a city in 1949.

Many of the early houses were designed by Clarence E. Shepherd, Edward Tanner, and Edward Buehler Delk.

The city's most distinctive landmark, which is used on the official city seal, is the Verona columns and reflecting pool at the intersection of Ensley Lane, Mission Drive and Overhill Road.  They were conceived by landscape architect S. Herbert Hare in 1924.

In 1928 Ernest Hemingway and his wife, Pauline, stayed at the house of W. Malcolm and Ruth Lowry at 6435 Indian Lane.  During this time, Hemingway wrote A Farewell to Arms.  He later gave an autographed copy of the book to Don Carlos Guffey, the Kansas City doctor who delivered his son Patrick.  The inscription, which is now in the University of Missouri-Kansas City library, said "...with much admiration and grateful remembrance of a Caesarean that was beautifully done and turned out splendidly."Geography

Mission Hills is located at  (39.013705, -94.615083). However, Brush Creek runs through the northern section of the city.

The northern half of Mission Hills, north of 63rd Street, is informally called "old Mission Hills" and is dominated by opulent houses on large lots. There are two private country clubs in this section: the Mission Hills Country Club and the Kansas City Country Club.  The southern half, consisting of developments Belinder Hills, Indian Hills and Sagamore Hills, contains affluent upper middle class residences and the private Indian Hills Country Club.

Demographics

According to Forbes Magazine, Mission Hills ranks as the 3rd wealthiest municipality in the country. Mission Hills has the highest median household income of any city in Kansas with a population over 1,000, as well as one of the highest median incomes for any city in the United States.

2010 census
At the 2010 census there were 3,498 people in 1,253 households, including 1,066 families, in the city. The racial makup of the city was 96.8% White, 0.2% African American, 0.2% Native American, 1.5% Asian, 0.2% from other races, and 1.1% from two or more races. Hispanic or Latino of any race were 1.8%.

Of the 1,253 households 37.0% had children under the age of 18 living with them, 79.7% were married couples living together, 3.8% had a female householder with no husband present, 1.6% had a male householder with no wife present, and 14.9% were non-families. 12.9% of households were one person and 8% were one person aged 65 or older. The average household size was 2.79 and the average family size was 3.07.

The median age was 47.1 years. 28.4% of residents were under the age of 18; 4% were between the ages of 18 and 24; 14.3% were from 25 to 44; 35% were from 45 to 64; and 18.1% were 65 or older. The gender makeup of the city was 48.6% male and 51.4% female.

2000 census
At the 2000 census there were 3,593 people in 1,284 households, including 1,104 families, in the city. The racial makup of the city was 98.22% White, 0.08% African American, 0.03% Native American, 0.86% Asian, 0.17% from other races, and 0.64% from two or more races. Hispanic or Latino of any race were 1.09%. 25.2% were of English, 21.4% German, 13.4% Irish and 7.1% American ancestry according to Census 2000.

Of the 1,284 households 38.5% had children under the age of 18 living with them, 81.2% were married couples living together, 3.7% had a female householder with no husband present, and 14.0% were non-families. 12.5% of households were one person and 7.6% were one person aged 65 or older. The average household size was 2.80 and the average family size was 3.06.

The age distribution was 29.6% under the age of 18, 3.1% from 18 to 24, 18.1% from 25 to 44, 32.5% from 45 to 64, and 16.8% 65 or older. The median age was 45 years. For every 100 females, there were 98.6 males. For every 100 females age 18 and over, there were 94.9 males.

The median household income was $188,821 and the median family income was $200,000. Males had a median income of $100,000 versus $62,440 for females. The per capita income for the city was $95,405. About 1.4% of families and 1.2% of the population were below the poverty line, including 0.8% of those under age 18 and 1.3% of those age 65 or over.

Education

Mission Hills is in the Shawnee Mission public school district.  Some families send their children to one of the many secular private schools in the city like the Pembroke Hill School and The Barstow School or to religiously affiliated schools such as Bishop Miege High School or Rockhurst High School.

Libraries
The Johnson County Library serves the residents of Mission Hills.

In the media
Mission Hills is a setting for the ABC Family television drama Switched at Birth''.  The show is set in Kansas City, Missouri, but the main characters live in Mission Hills.

Mission Hills was ranked number 3 on the Forbes list of America's most affluent neighborhoods.

Notable people
Notable individuals who were born in and/or have lived in Mission Hills include:
 Barbara Bollier (1958- ), Kansas state legislator
 Henry W. Bloch (1922-2019), Co-founder H&R Block
 George Brett (1953- ), Baseball Hall of Fame third baseman
 Marcelo Claure (1970- ), telecommunications executive
David Dreier (1952- ), member of Congress, chairman of the House Rules Committee, chairman of Tribune Publishing
 James Ellroy (1948- ), novelist
 Thomas Frank (1965- ), historian, journalist
 Matt Gogel (1971- ), pro golfer, sportscaster
 Donald J. Hall, Sr. (1929- ), greeting cards executive
 Kevin Harlan (1960- ), sportscaster
 Ewing Kauffman (1916-1993), pharmaceutical entrepreneur
 Tom Watson (1949- ), pro golfer
 Carrie Westcott (1969- ), model, actress
 Cheryl Womack (1950- ), trucking entrepreneur, executive
 David Wysong (1949- ), Kansas state legislator

References

Further reading

External links

 City of Mission Hills
 Mission Hills - Directory of Public Officials
 Kansas City metro area map, KDOT

Cities in Kansas
Cities in Johnson County, Kansas
Cities in Kansas City metropolitan area
1949 establishments in Kansas